Anatoliy Verteletsky is a Ukrainian retired footballer.

Career
Anatoliy Verteletsky started playing football in Crimea at the age of 10. The first coach is Vladimir Alexandrovich Grigoriev.

He played in the Sevastopol for Chayka-VMS Sevastopol, the Dynamo Saky and the Stal Alchevsk. In Alchevsk he played 242 games and scored 15 goals, of which 25 (1) in the Major League, 203 (13) in the First League, and 14 (1) in the Ukrainian Cup. He made his debut in the top division on July 12, 2000 in a game against CSKA Kiev (1: 2). At the end of 2004, the footballer's contract with Stal expired and the club's management decided not to sign a new agreement.

Verteletsky left for Kazakhstan, where he was among eight Ukrainians playing for Ekibastuz. Anatoly's partners in the Kazakh team were Eduard Stolbovoy, Andrey Oksimets, Andrey Zavyalov, Oleg Syomka, Sergey Yakovenko and others.

Finished his career in the first-league Desna Chernihiv and Mykolaiv.

Honours
Ekibastuz
 Kazakhstan First League: 2005

Stal Alchevsk
 Ukrainian First League: 2004–05

Stal Kamianske
 Ukrainian Second League: 2003–04

References

External links 
 Anatoliy Verteletsky footballfacts.ru
 Anatoliy Verteletsky allplayers.in.ua

1975 births
Living people
FC Desna Chernihiv players
FC Stal-2 Alchevsk players
Ukrainian footballers
Ukrainian Premier League players
Ukrainian First League players
Ukrainian Second League players
Ukrainian expatriate sportspeople in Kazakhstan
Ukrainian expatriate footballers
Expatriate footballers in Kazakhstan
Association football midfielders